Lori Ann Duque Mai (November 16, 1977 – September 16, 2009) was a German–American folk rock singer and musician.

Early life
Mai was born in Dallas, Texas to American parents. She grew up in Cooper City, Florida, a suburb of Fort Lauderdale with her mother, Carolyn Cooper Stoner, her sister, Lisa Duque Zilinski and stepfather, Marvin E Stoner, Jr. a Broward County Sheriff Deputy Chief, In 1990, she moved to Mission, Texas to live with her father Joe Duque for a couple of years, moved back to Florida and then in 1999 moved to Berlin.

Music career
In February 2008, Mai was a candidate of the casting television show, Deutschland sucht den Superstar. She performed from a motorized wheelchair because she was diagnosed with amyotrophic lateral sclerosis (ALS). Later, she acquired a record deal with Music 2 Gold and produced her first and only album, Be What I Am, released on May 9, 2008.

Personal life
Mai was married and had two children, Alenka and Anuschka, whom she had lived with during her residence in both Estenfeld and Berlin.

Discography
Albums
 Be What I Am (2008)

Singles
Killing Me Softly (2008)
My Promise (2008)

Death
Mai died on September 16, 2009 in Mission, Texas, from complications due to amyotrophic lateral sclerosis.

References

External links
 Official Site
 Official MySpace

1979 births
2009 deaths
German women singers
German rock singers
Musicians from Dallas
American folk singers
American emigrants to Germany
20th-century American singers
20th-century German musicians
20th-century American women singers
20th-century German women
21st-century American women